Judy Fox is an American sculptor who was born in Elizabeth, New Jersey in 1957.  She studied at the Skowhegan School of Painting and Sculpture in 1976, earned a BA from Yale University in 1978, studied at the École Nationale Supérieure des Beaux-Arts Paris, France in 1979, and received an MFA from New York University in 1983.  She was an art student at the time when figurative art was submerged by abstraction, and took that as a challenge.  In 2006, she was awarded a John Simon Guggenheim Memorial Foundation fellowship.  Fox is a faculty member at the New York Academy of Art. Judy Fox lives and works in New York City.

She is best known for her fired clay life size figures of nude women and children that are realistically painted with casein paint.  Her sculptures of children address gender roles, and her meticulously detailed adult nudes reflect her interest in feminist issues.  Courtesan from 1995, in the collection of the Honolulu Museum of Art, is an example of the artist's life size terracotta nudes of small children.  The  (in Klosterneuburg, Austria), the Honolulu Museum of Art, the Mint Museum of Art (Charlotte, North Carolina), and the Museum Moderner Kunst (Vienna) are among the public collections holding works by Judy Fox.

In 2020, Fox's work was included as part of Intersect Chicago. In 2022, Fox was one of fifteen artists who won the American Academy of Arts and Letters award.

She is represented by Nancy Hoffman Gallery in New York.

Sources and notes

 Diehl, Carol, Judy Fox, Figures in Limbo, Art in America, November, 2000.
 Nadelman, Cynthia, Middle Aged Gods and Giant Babies, ARTnews, December, 2004.

American women sculptors
Artists from Elizabeth, New Jersey
New York University alumni
Yale University alumni
Living people
1957 births
Artists from New York City
Skowhegan School of Painting and Sculpture alumni
Sculptors from New York (state)
Sculptors from New Jersey
21st-century American women artists